Chamaexeros is a genus of tufted perennial herbs in the family Asparagaceae, subfamily Lomandroideae (formerly family Laxmanniaceae).

The genus contains 4 known species, all endemic to Western Australia:

 Chamaexeros fimbriata (F.Muell.) Benth. 
 Chamaexeros longicaulis  T.D.Macfarl.
 Chamaexeros macranthera  Kuchel
 Chamaexeros serra  (Endl.) Benth. Little Fringe-leaf

References

Asparagaceae genera
Asparagales of Australia
Lomandroideae
Endemic flora of Southwest Australia